IntegraFin Holdings plc (IntegraFin) is a UK company which owns Integrated Financial Arrangements Limited (IFAL). It is listed on the London Stock Exchange and is a constituent of the FTSE 250 Index.

History
The company was founded by Mike Howard who started the company in a flat above the Firehouse restaurant at Tabernacle Street in Shoreditch in London in April 1999. It was the subject of an initial public offering which valued the company at circa £650 million in March 2018.

Operations
IFAL operates the Transact investment platform which provides a wrap service to UK financial advisers and their clients.

References

External links
Official site

Financial services companies established in 1999
Companies listed on the London Stock Exchange
1999 establishments in England